Sheila Dills (born July 10, 1967) is an American politician who served in the Oklahoma House of Representatives from the 69th district from 2018 to 2022.

Dills plans to retire from the Oklahoma House at the end of her term in 2022.

Career

57th Oklahoma Legislature
Dills was the author of House Bill 1395 (2019) "Virtual Charter Financial Transparency", which became law, and makes charter schools in Oklahoma itemize out spending to the state educational committees. Dills later stated that during the passage of House Bill 1395 she was forced to meet with Epic Charter Schools co-founder Ben Harris. While Harris agreed to the language in the bill, its requirements would later lead to his arrest for falsifying invoices required by the bill.

58th Oklahoma Legislature
Dills authored House Bill 1735 (2021), which died in committee, to increase oversight of charters schools and education management organizations.

Dills was a supporter of Senate Bill 2 (2021), a controversial transphobic sports bill, and Oklahoma Senate Bill 1100, which banned non-binary gender markers on birth certificates.

Retirement
Dills announced she would retire and not seek re-election in 2022. After announcing her retirement, she told the Tulsa World "The culture (of the Legislature) is ridiculous. The people of Oklahoma are getting ripped off big time. … It’s a disgusting environment.”

References

1967 births
Living people
Republican Party members of the Oklahoma House of Representatives
21st-century American politicians
21st-century American women politicians
Women state legislators in Oklahoma